House of Delegates may refer to:

Current
 Maryland House of Delegates
 House of Delegates of Palau
 Virginia House of Delegates
 West Virginia House of Delegates

Former
 House of Delegates (South Africa), the legislative chamber for the Indian population of South Africa from 1984 to 1994
 Legislative Assembly of Puerto Rico between 1900 and 1917